Kirmington is a village in North Lincolnshire, England. It is part of the civil parish of Kirmington and Croxton. From the 2011 census the village became a civil parish in its own name.

Kirmington's recorded population in the 2001 Census was 337, increasing to 365 in the 2011 Census.

The village Grade II* listed Anglican church is dedicated to St Helena. The church is in Perpendicular and Decorated style, with chancel nave and vestry, and a 12th-century tower. In 1838 a wooden spire covered in copper was added.

The church was restored in 1859 by Samuel Sanders Teulon, who rebuilt both aisles and re-roofed the nave. St Helena's is part of the Brocklesby Park Group of the Deanery of Yarborough. St Helena was the mother of the Roman Emperor Constantine.

A Wesleyan Methodist chapel was built in 1835, rebuilt in 1885, and was closed in 1976.

The village school is Kirmington St Helena's Church of England Primary school, built in the 19th century, and extended, with additional facilities for pre-school children, in 2007.

Kirmington is twinned with Terbregge, in the Netherlands. This relationship commemorates Operation Manna, in which planes from RAF Kirmington dropped 3,000 food parcels in April and May 1945.

Humberside Airport

RAF Kirmington was a Class A airfield of the Second World War. Construction began in 1941, and the airfield was opened for use by Bomber Command in summer 1942.

Closed in 1953, it was used for agricultural flying until being converted for commercial use by Lindsey County Council. It opened as Humberside Airport in March 1974.

Eastern Airways has its head office, Schiphol House, at Humberside Airport.

References

External links 

"Kirmington Church of England Primary School"; Kirmington.n-lincs.sch.uk. Retrieved 21 April 2012

Villages in the Borough of North Lincolnshire

World War II prisoner of war camps in England